The Central European Basketball League (also known as the  CEBL) was a professional basketball competition in Central Europe. It was composed of teams from Slovakia, Czech Republic, Austria, Hungary and Romania. The CEBL was created in 2007 and folded in 2010.

Teams
Teams that participated in the 2008–09 season.

Finals

External links
Official website

2007 establishments in Europe
2010 disestablishments in Europe
Defunct multi-national basketball leagues in Europe
Basketball leagues in Austria
Basketball leagues in the Czech Republic
Basketball competitions in Romania
Basketball leagues in Hungary
Basketball leagues in Slovakia
2009–10 in European basketball leagues
Sports leagues established in 2007